National Public Gardens Day, occurring annually on the Friday before Mother's Day, is a day to promote awareness of botanic gardens, arboreta, zoos, historic gardens, or any of North America's public gardens. The day was established by the American Public Gardens Association, a Pennsylvania non-profit organization that supports, resources and promotes public gardens in North America.

Activities
Members of the American Public Gardens Association celebrated National Public Gardens Day beginning in 2009 with activities that varied by garden. The Atlanta Botanical Garden invited visitors to bring flowers so that they could be put into arrangements for patients and their families at Children's Hospital The Desert Botanical Garden in Phoenix, Arizona, asked visitors to pledge to conserve water, displaying 400 five-gallon water containers that pledgers could adopt. National spokesperson Paul James visited media gardens, speaking with the public and media about the role public gardens play in the local community.

In 2010, Senator Dick Durbin of Illinois spoke on the floor of the U.S. Senate about the importance of recognizing National Public Gardens Day, listing the US Botanic Garden and gardens in Illinois as examples.

History
Created in 2009, in partnership with sponsor, Rain Bird, as a way to increase public awareness of the educational resources public gardens provide to local communities, National Public Gardens Day was adopted by the members of the American Public Gardens Association, to highlight programs such as plant conservation, water conservation, the preservation of green spaces, and home gardening.

The national spokesperson for National Public Gardens Day was Paul James, host of HGTV's Gardening By The Yard.

Recognition 
National Public Gardens Day has been recognized by various levels of government:
The City of Philadelphia, Pennsylvania
The City of Dallas, Texas
The City of Belmont, North Carolina
The State of Delaware
The Town of Framingham, Massachusetts
The State of California, State Assembly
The State of California, Governor's Office
The State of Florida
The United States Congress

References

External links 

 
American Public Gardens Association
National Public Gardens Day on Twitter
National Public Gardens Day on Facebook

Gardens in the United States
Public Gardens
Public Gardens
Botanical gardens
Public Gardens